August Sander (17 November 1876 – 20 April 1964) was a German portrait and documentary photographer. His first book Face of our Time (German: Antlitz der Zeit) was published in 1929. Sander has been described as "the most important German portrait photographer of the early twentieth century". Sander's work includes landscape, nature, architecture, and street photography, but he is best known for his portraits, as exemplified by his series People of the 20th Century. In this series, he aims to show a cross-section of society during the Weimar Republic.

Early life
Sander was born on November 17, 1876 in Herdorf, the son of a carpenter working in the mining industry. He had six siblings.

Career
While working at the local Herdorf iron-ore mine, Sander first learned about photography by assisting a photographer from Siegen who was also working for the mining company. With financial support from his uncle, he bought photographic equipment and set up his own darkroom.

Sander spent his military service (1897–1899) as an assistant to Georg Jung of  Trier; they worked throughout Germany including in Berlin, Magdeburg, Halle, Leipzig and Dresden. In 1901, he started working for Photographische Kunstanstalt Greif photo studio in Linz, Austria-Hungary, becoming a partner in 1902, and then sole-owner. In the late 1940's he joined the Upper Austrian Art Society. Sander left Linz at the end of 1909 or 1910 and set up a new studio at Dürener Strasse 201 in the Lindenthal district of Cologne. 

In 1911, Sander began with the first series of portraits for his work . In this series, he aims to show a cross-section of society during the Weimar Republic. The series is divided into seven sections: The Farmer, The Skilled Tradesman, Woman, Classes and Professions, The Artists, The City, and The Last People (homeless persons, veterans, etc.).

In the early 1920s, he came in contact with the Cologne Progressives, a radical group of artists linked to the workers' movement, which, as Wieland Schmied put it, "sought to combine constructivism and objectivity, geometry and object, the general and the particular, avant-garde conviction and political engagement, and which perhaps approximated most to the forward looking of New Objectivity [...] ". In 1927, Sander and writer Ludwig Mathar travelled through Sardinia for three months, where he took around 500 photographs. However, a planned book detailing his travels was not completed.

Sander's Face of our Time was published in 1929. It contains a selection of 60 portraits from his series People of the 20th Century, and is introduced by an essay by Alfred Döblin titled "On Faces, Pictures, and their Truth". Under the Nazi regime, his work and personal life were greatly constrained. Sander's 1929 book Face of our Time was seized in 1936 and the photographic plates destroyed.

Around 1942, during World War II, he left Cologne and moved to the small village of Kuchhausen, in the Westerwald region; this allowed him to save the most important part of his body of work. His Cologne studio was destroyed in a 1944 bombing raid, but tens of thousands of negatives, which he had left behind in a basement near his former apartment in the city, survived the war. 25,000 to 30,000 negatives in this basement were then destroyed in a 1946 fire. That same year, Sander began his postwar photographic documentation of the city. He also tried to record the mass rape of German women by Red Army soldiers in the Soviet occupation zone.

In 1953, Sander sold a portfolio of 408 photographs of Cologne, taken between 1920 and 1939, to the Kölnisches Stadtmuseum. These would be posthumously published in book format in 1988, under the title Köln wie es war (Cologne as it was).

In 1962, 80 photographs from the People of the 20th Century project were published in book format, under the name Deutschenspiegel. Menschen des 20. Jahrhunderts (German Mirror. People of the 20th Century).

Personal life and death
Sander married Anna Seitenmacher in 1902. They gave birth to Erich (son, born in 1903) and Gunther (son, born in 1907), and girl twins in 1911, Sigrid and Helmut, only Siugrid survived. Anna died on May 27 1957 in Kuchhausen, Germany.

Erich, who was a member of the left wing Socialist Workers' Party (SAP), was arrested by Nazis in 1934 and sentenced to 10 years in prison, where he died of an untreated ruptured appendix in 1944, shortly before the end of his sentence.

Sander died in Cologne of a stroke on 20 April 1964. He was buried next to his son Erich in Cologne's Melaten Cemetery.

Legacy
In 1984 Sander was inducted into the International Photography Hall of Fame and Museum.

In Wim Wenders' 1987 film  ("Wings of Desire"), the character Homer (played by Curt Bois) studies the portraits of People of the 20th Century (1980 edition) while visiting a library.

In 2008, the Mercury crater Sander was named after him.

The highest price reached by one of his photographs was when Bricklayer sold by $749,000 at Sotheby's New York, on 11 December 2014.

Ownership rights
In 1992, Gerd Sander, August's son, sold the archive to German nonprofit art foundation SK Stiftung Kultur. It is on display at Die Photographische Sammlung/SK Stiftung Kultur.

In 2017 Julian Sander, Gerd's son, claimed to represent August's estate, and issued a press release stating that the archive would now be housed by Hauser & Wirth. The claim has been disputed by SK Stiftung Kultur, and the ownership dispute is still ongoing.

In 2022, Julian Sander made available non-fungible tokens (NFTs) of the entire 10,700 archive of Sander negatives on NFT platform OpenSea. Buying a Sander NFT was free apart from initial upload fees. However for all resale transactions thereon, via a smart contract Julian Sander would receive 7.5% of the resale cost and photographer Alejandro Cartagena's Fellowship Trust would receive 2.5%. All NFTs in the collection were claimed and, within a few weeks, over 400 ETH was traded in secondary sales on OpenSea. Soon and without warning, the archive was delisted from OpenSea because SK Stiftung Kultur claimed that as it owns the copyright to Sander's work until 2034, the NFT collection is thus in violation of copyright law. Julian Sander argues that the doctrine of fair use allows him to publish the images in such commercial settings.

Publications
 
 
  (234 images)
  (431 pages, hardcover edition) (A 1994 softcover exists as well under ISBN 3-8881-4723-9 / 978-3-88814723-4.)
  (208 pages, 695 images, hardcover with protective sheet.)
  (1436 pages, 619 tritone images, hardcover edition of 7 volumes in slipcase. Volume I  (The farmer): 272 pages/115 images. Volume II  (The skilled tradesman): 152 pages/63 images. Volume III  (The woman): 172 pages/74 images. Volume IV  (Classes and professions): 280 pages/127 images. Volume V  (The artists): 204 pages/90 images. Volume VI  (The city): 300 pages/134 images. Volume VII  (The last people): 56 pages/16 images.);  (1400 pages, hardcover edition of 7 volumes in slipcase.). A French-only edition named  and a Spanish-only edition named  exist as well.
  (Hardcover);  (808 pages, 619 duotone images, hardcover). (Reprinted in 2021.)

Collections
Sander's work is held in the following permanent collection:
Museum of Modern Art, New York: 748 works (as of 31 December 2022)
Tate, UK: 5 prints (as of 31 December 2022)

Exhibitions 
August Sander: People of the Twentieth Century—A Photographic Portrait of Germany, Metropolitan Museum of Art, New York, 2004
 August Sander, People of the 20th Century, São Paulo Art Biennial, Brazil, 2012
 Portrait.Landscape.Architecture, Multimedia Art Museum, Moscow, 2013
Portraying a Nation: Germany 1919–1933, Tate Liverpool. Paired with work by Otto Dix.

See also
Ismo Hölttö

References

External links
 August Sander artist profile on Ocula

1876 births
1964 deaths
People from Altenkirchen (district)
People from the Rhine Province
Photographers from Rhineland-Palatinate
Portrait photographers
20th-century German photographers